Marinomonas mediterranea is a lysogenic bacterium from the genus of Marinomonas which has been isolated from seawater from the coast of the Mediterranean Sea in Spain.

References

Oceanospirillales
Bacteria described in 1999